Lewis Daniel Hill (April 11, 1965 – February 7, 2021) was an American basketball coach.  He was the head coach for the Texas–Rio Grande Valley Vaqueros men's basketball team.

Playing career
Hill, a 1983 graduate of Mount Vernon High School in the state of New York, began his college career at San Jacinto College where he helped the team win the 1984 NJCAA Men's Division I Basketball Championship title, while also earning JUCO All-American honors. Hill completed his college career at Wichita State under Eddie Fogler, earning All-Missouri Valley Conference honors as a senior.

In the 1988–89 season, Hill played professionally for DTV Charlottenburg in the German Basketball Bundesliga and in the FIBA Korać Cup. A car accident ended his playing days.

Coaching career
After his playing career, Hill got his coaching start at Wichita East High School as an assistant coach for one season before entering the college ranks to join the staff of South Alabama. Following stops at SE Missouri State and East Carolina, Hill joined Melvin Watkins's staff at Texas A&M, where he stayed until 2004.

Hill then joined Lon Kruger's staff at UNLV, and followed him to Oklahoma, where he was part of eight NCAA tournament appearances, including a Final Four appearance by the Sooners during the 2015–16 season.

In 2016, Hill accepted the head coaching position at Texas–Rio Grande Valley, replacing Dan Hipsher. At the close of the 2020–21 season he was posthumously named the Western Athletic Conference Coach of the Year. He was also posthumously named as the recipient of the 2021 Skip Prosser Man of the Year Award.

Death
Hill developed COVID-19 in late January 2021, during the COVID-19 pandemic in Texas, while battling other medical issues. He was preparing to step down amid his fifth season as head coach at UTRGV, when he died on February 7, 2021, at age 55. He is survived by his wife and their two children and three other children from a previous marriage.

Head coaching record

References

External links
 Texas–Rio Grande Valley profile
 Oklahoma profile

1965 births
2021 deaths
American men's basketball coaches
American men's basketball players
Basketball coaches from New York (state)
Basketball players from New York (state)
East Carolina Pirates men's basketball coaches
High school basketball coaches in the United States
Oklahoma Sooners men's basketball coaches
San Jacinto Central Ravens men's basketball players
South Alabama Jaguars men's basketball coaches
Southeast Missouri State Redhawks men's basketball coaches
Sportspeople from Mount Vernon, New York
Texas A&M Aggies men's basketball coaches
UT Rio Grande Valley Vaqueros men's basketball coaches
UNLV Runnin' Rebels basketball coaches
Wichita State Shockers men's basketball players